Chen Yunying (born February 1953) is a Chinese educator and politician. She is a representative of the National People's Congress for Taiwan Province and the wife of Justin Yifu Lin.

References 

1953 births
Living people
Politicians from Taipei
21st-century Chinese women politicians
21st-century Chinese politicians
20th-century Chinese educators
21st-century Chinese educators
Delegates to the 10th National People's Congress
Delegates to the 11th National People's Congress
Delegates to the 12th National People's Congress
Delegates to the 13th National People's Congress
Taiwanese emigrants to China
Female members of the National People's Congress